Jaber Metro Station is a station on Isfahan Metro Line 1. The station opened on 15 October 2015. It is located at Adelpur St., in northern Isfahan. The next station on the northwest side is Shahid Alikhani Station and on the south side Kaveh Station.

References

Isfahan Metro stations
Railway stations opened in 2015